Saucedo is a Spanish surname that became popular in the 16th century. It means "Of or relating to the Willow Tree". The first people with that name were Spanish settlers who came to America from an area in Spain known as the "Valle de Salcedo" (Salcedo Valley, in the Basque Country). From then on, the name variated from Salcedo to other names such as Salcido. The Basque version is Saratsu or Sarasua

People
Aaron Saucedo (born 1994), main suspect in the Maryvale serial shooter case 
Cirilo Saucedo (born 1982), Mexican footballer
Danny Saucedo (born 1986), Swedish singer-songwriter of Bolivian descent
David Saucedo (born 1981), Argentine boxer
Fernando Saucedo (born 1990), Bolivian footballer
Francisco Montes de Oca y Saucedo (1837 – 1885), Mexican politician and military surgeon
Gonzalo Saucedo (born 1985), Argentine footballer
Guillermo Saucedo (born 1940), Argentine fencer
Mauricio Saucedo (born 1985), Bolivian footballer
Michael Saucedo (born 1970), American television actor
Pablo Saucedo (born 1982), Argentine Ecuadorian footballer
Raúl Saucedo (1904 – ?), Argentine fencer
Rick Saucedo (born 1955), musician, songwriter, actor and Elvis tribute artist
Roberto Nicolás Saucedo (born 1982), Argentine footballer
Tayler Saucedo (born 1993), American baseball player
Ulises Saucedo (1896 – 1963), Bolivian football coach and referee
Luz del Rosario Saucedo (born 1983), Mexican footballer

See also
Salcedo (disambiguation)

Spanish-language surnames